Nanjing Fuxing is a metro station in Taipei, Taiwan served by the Taipei Metro. Formerly Nanking East Road (from 1996 until 2003) and  Nanjing East Road (from 2003 until 2014), it was renamed on 15 November 2014 to avoid confusion since the Green line runs almost entirely under Nanjing East Road.

Station overview
The station is located at the intersection of Fuxing North Rd. and Nanjing East Rd. It has two side platforms (Brown Line), one island platform (Green Line), and eight exits. All platforms are equipped with platform screen doors, three of them are wheelchair-accessible. This station connects to Taipei Arena, China Airlines Headquarters, Taipei Cultural Center and Taipei Municipal Stadium.

The Green Line station is a three-level, underground station underneath Nanjing East Rd. Excavation depth is 25 meters, while the station is 240 meters long and 22 meters wide. Seven additional exits have been added along with the completion of Green Line.

Public art
The Green Line station has a theme of "Reflective Mosaic of Light". The focus is on variations of light and shadow, and turns the station into a miniature art museum with artworks in every corner.

Station layout

Around the station
 Bureau of Energy
 Japan–Taiwan Exchange Association
 Japanese Cultural Center
Liaoning Street Night Market
Changchun Market

References

External links

Wenhu line stations
Songshan–Xindian line stations
Railway stations opened in 1996